Phil or Philip Kelly may refer to:

Phil Kelly (artist) (1950–2010), Irish expressionist painter.
Phil Kelly (Australian footballer) (born 1957), Australian rules footballer.
Phil Kelly (footballer, born 1869) (1869–?), English association football player (Liverpool FC).
Phil Kelly (footballer, born 1939) (1939–2012), Irish association football player.
Phil Kelly (journalist) (born 1946), English journalist, editor and Labour councillor.
Philip Kelly (Australian politician) (1886–1954), member of the Tasmanian House of Assembly.
Philip Kelly (Canadian politician) (1901–1985), member of the Legislative Assembly of Ontario.
Philip James Vandeleur Kelly, British Army general.
Phil Kelly (American political scientist), the Roe R. Cross Distinguished Professor of Political Science at Emporia State University.